Bundesstraße 28 or B 28 is a German federal road. The road runs west through Baden-Württemberg from the eastern terminus of the French route nationale 4 in Strasbourg, after crossing the Rhine river in Kehl, to Senden in Bavaria, where it terminates into the A7.

Cities crossed
 Freudenstadt
 Tübingen
 Reutlingen
 Ulm
 Senden

See also 
List of federal highways in Germany

028
Roads in Baden-Württemberg